2017–18 Iran Football's 2nd Division  is the 17th under 2nd Division since its establishment (current format) in 2001. The season featured 25 teams from the 2nd Division 2016–17, three new teams relegated from the 2016–17 Azadegan League: Kheibar Khoramabad, Foolad Yazd, Esteghlal Ahvaz, and five new teams promoted from the 3rd Division 2016–17: Shahrdari Bam, Mes Novin Kerman, Perspolis Mashhad, Khoushe Talaye Sana, Shohadaye Babolsar.

Teams

Stadia and locations

Number of teams by region

League table

Group A

Group B

Group C

Second round

Group A

Group B

2nd Division  Play-off

Leg 1

Leg 2

References

External links
 League 2 Iran | Results, Fixtures, Standings ... 

League 2 (Iran) seasons
3